Kunturkanki District is one of eight districts in the Canas Province in Peru. Its seat is the village of El Descanso.

Geography 
Other mountains are listed below:

Ethnic groups 
The people in the district are mainly indigenous citizens of Quechua descent. Quechua is the language which the majority of the population (89.61%) learnt to speak in childhood, 10.26% of the residents started speaking using the Spanish language (2007 Peru Census).

References